El Salvador has transport links by road, rail, sea and air.

El Salvador has over 10,000 km of roads, and one passenger rail service. There are several seaports on the Pacific Ocean, and two international airports.

Railways

A weekday passenger service links San Salvador and Apopa, a journey of 40 minutes. Of a total of 602 km narrow gauge rail, much is abandoned. In November 2013 the government rail agency FENADESAL announced plans for development of four electrified railways serving San Salvador, Sitio del Niño (La Libertad), El Salvador International Airport, La Unión, and the Honduran frontier.

Railway links with adjacent countries
  Guatemala  -  gauge both countries, currently closed.
  Honduras - none

Highways

total: 10,029 km
paved: 1,986 km (including 327 km of Highways)
unpaved: 8,043 km (1999 est.)

The RN-21 (Bulevar Monseñor Romero) (East–West) is the very first freeway to be built in El Salvador and in Central America. The freeway passes the northern area of the city of Santa Tecla, La Libertad. It has a small portion serving Antiguo Cuscatlan, La Libertad, and merges with the RN-5 (Autopista Comalapa) (East–West, Boulevard de Los Proceres/Autopista del Aeropuerto) in San Salvador. 

The RN-21 was named in honor of Monseñor Romero. The first phase of the highway was completed in 2009, and the second phase in November 2012.

Ports and harbors

Pacific Ocean 
 Acajutla
 Puerto Cutuco
 La Libertad
 La Unión
 Puerto El Triunfo

Merchant marine
none (1999 est.)

Airports

75 (2006 est.)

Airports - with paved runways
total: 4
over 3,047 m: 1
1,524 to 2,437 m: 1
914 to 1,523 m: 2 (2006 est.)

Airports - with unpaved runways
total: 71
1,524 to 2,437 m: 1
914 to 1,523 m: 14
under 914 m: 56 (2006 est.)

Heliports
1 (2006 est.)

Airports by name

 Airport of the Pacific (under construction)
 El Salvador International Airport
 Ilopango International Airport

References

External links